Giacinto Gaetano Chiurlia (also Giacinto Gaetano Chyurlia) (4 January 1659 – 23 March 1730) was a Roman Catholic prelate who served as Bishop of Giovinazzo (1693–1730).

Biography
Giacinto Gaetano Chiurlia was born in Rome, Italy. On 24 August 1693, he was appointed by Pope Innocent XII as Coadjutor Bishop of Giovinazzo.  On 24 August 1693, he was consecrated bishop by Galeazzo Marescotti, Cardinal-Priest of Santi Quirico e Giulitta with Sperello Sperelli, Bishop of Terni, and Stefano Giuseppe Menatti, Titular Bishop of Cyrene, serving as co-consecrators. He served as Bishop of Giovinazzo until his death on 23 March 1730.

Episcopal succession

See also
Catholic Church in Italy

References

External links and additional sources
 (for Chronology of Bishops) 
 (for Chronology of Bishops) 

17th-century Italian Roman Catholic bishops
1659 births
1730 deaths
Bishops appointed by Pope Innocent XII